"You're My Thrill" is a 1933 popular song, composed by Jay Gorney, with lyrics by Sidney Clare. It was introduced in the film Jimmy and Sally (1933).

Recorded versions
 Ward Silloway (1933)
 Al Bowlly with Lew Stone and His Band (1934)
 Lena Horne with Charlie Barnet and his Orchestra (1941)
 Mary Ann McCall with orchestra directed by Phil Moore (1948)
 Doris Day with John Rarig & Orchestra for her album You're My Thrill (1949).
 Billie Holiday (1950)
 Julie London arranged and conducted by Russ Garcia – Make Love to Me (1956)
 Peggy Lee – Black Coffee (1956), Moments Like This (1993)
 Wilbur Ware – This Is New (1957)
 Harry James – arranged by J. Hill – Harry's Choice (1958) (Capitol Records – ST 1093)
 Pepper Adams – 10 to 4 at the Five Spot (1958)
 Marti Barris (1959)
 Max Roach with Abbey Lincoln (1959) (on The Complete Mercury Max Roach Plus Four Sessions, released 2000)
 Ella Fitzgerald – Clap Hands, Here Comes Charlie! (1961)
 Nat "King" Cole - recorded on November 12, 1958 and later released on a compilation album. The Unforgettable Nat King Cole Sings the Great Songs (1966).
 Abbey Lincoln – Talking to the Sun (1983)
 Chet Baker – Chet Baker Sings and Plays from the Film Let's Get Lost (1988)
 Shirley Horn – Softly (1988), You're My Thrill (2001)
 Maria Muldaur – Jazzabelle (1995)
The Blackeyed Susans - Spin the Bottle (1997)
 Robert Palmer with orchestra arranged and conducted by Clare Fischer – Don't Explain (1990) (reissued in 1992 on Ridin' High)
 Joni Mitchell – Both Sides Now (2000)
 Jeremy Steig – Flute on the Edge (2005)
 Amel Larrieux – Lovely Standards (2007)
 Holly Cole – Holly Cole (2007)
 Diana Krall – Quiet Nights (2009)
 Fourplay with Anita Baker – Let's Touch the Sky (2010)
 Anjulie (2011)
 Sylvia Brooks – Restless (2012)
 Jamala – The Guide (2014)
 Cécile McLorin Salvant — Dreams and Daggers'' (2017)

References

Lena Horne songs
1933 songs
Songs with lyrics by Sidney Clare
Songs with music by Jay Gorney